The 2013–14 season was the 111th season in the existence of Go Ahead Eagles and the club's first season back in the top flight of Dutch football. In addition to the domestic league, Go Ahead Eagles participated in this season's edition of the KNVB Cup.

Players

First-team squad

 (on loan from Betis)

 (on loan from SC Heerenveen)
 (on loan from OH Leuven)
 (on loan from AZ)

 (on loan from AZ)

 (on loan from Cercle Brugge)

Out on loan

Pre-season and friendlies

Competitions

Overall record

Eredivisie

League table

Results summary

Results by round

Matches

KNVB Cup

References

Go Ahead Eagles seasons
Go Ahead Eagles